Jerry Gale Cornelison (born September 13, 1936) is a former gridiron football offensive tackle who played professionally in the Canadian Football League (CFL) and the American Football League (AFL).

Although he was selected by the Cleveland Browns of the National Football League (NFL) in the 1958 NFL Draft, Cornelison began his professional career with the Saskatchewan Roughriders of the CFL. He then played five seasons in the AFL, from 1960 to 1965, for the Dallas Texans / Kansas City Chiefs.  In 1962, he was an AFL All-Star at offensive guard.

See also
 List of American Football League players

References

1936 births
Living people
American football offensive tackles
American players of Canadian football
Canadian football offensive linemen
Dallas Texans (AFL) players
Kansas City Chiefs players
SMU Mustangs football players
Saskatchewan Roughriders players
American Football League All-Star players
Players of American football from Dallas
Players of Canadian football from Dallas
American Football League players